Divine Providence is the fourth album by American indie-rock band Deer Tick. Produced by Cosmic Thug production duo Adam Landry and Justin Collins, the album was the first to feature the current lineup of the band and displayed a louder and faster sound than previous releases, with the band aiming to capture “the raw and spontaneous kerosene blaze”. Divine Providence was released on October 24, 2011 on Partisan Records in the US and April 2, 2012 on Loose Music in the UK and Europe.

Track listing

References

External links
 
 Deer Tick @ Partisan Records
 MySpace

2011 albums
Deer Tick (band) albums
Partisan Records albums